Strathcarron Hospice is a free palliative care resource in Denny, Scotland, serving people in the Forth Valley and North Lanarkshire areas.

It was established in 1981 by Dr. Harold Lyon and friends, and cares for patients with an active, life-limiting disease. It relies heavily on volunteers and fundraising to provide its service.

References

1981 establishments in Scotland
Organizations established in 1981
Organisations based in Falkirk (council area)
Hospices in Scotland
Charities based in Scotland
Denny, Falkirk